The Kiel tramway network once formed part of the public transport system in Kiel, now in the federal state of Schleswig-Holstein, Germany. Opened in 1881, the network lasted until 1985. Kiel tramway was the last tram system in Schleswig-Holstein.

See also
List of town tramway systems in Germany
Trams in Germany

References

Further reading

External links

Kiel
Kiel
Transport in Kiel
1100 mm gauge railways in Germany